Tillandsia prodigiosa is a species of flowering plant in the family Bromeliaceae. It is endemic to Mexico.

References

prodigiosa
Flora of Mexico
Taxa named by Charles Antoine Lemaire
Taxa named by John Gilbert Baker